Gregg Edelman (born September 12, 1958) is an American movie, television and theatre actor.

Biography
Edelman was born in Chicago, Illinois, attended Niles North High School, where he starred as Li'l Abner opposite future soap star Nancy Lee Grahn, and was trained at Northwestern University (Evanston, Illinois). He was married from 1995 to 2015 to actress Carolee Carmello; they first met during the run of City of Angels, and later during another production. They have two children, a daughter Zoe and son Ethan.

He made his Broadway debut in the 1979 production of Evita and started attracting attention for his performance as Cliff in the 1987 Broadway revival of Cabaret.

Stage credits

 Camelot, Lancelot, 1980
 Evita, Ensemble, 1980–1981
 Oliver!, Londoner, Broadway, 1984
 Cats, Bustopher Jones/Gus/Growltiger, 1986
 Cabaret, Clifford Bradshaw, Broadway, 1987
 Anything Goes, Billy Crocker, Broadway, 1988
 City of Angels, Stine, Broadway, 1989
 Arthur the Musical, Arthur, Goodspeed Opera House, Connecticut, 1991
 Anna Karenina, Constantine Levin, Broadway, 1992
 Falsettos, Marvin, Broadway, 1993
 Greetings, Andy Gorski, Off-Broadway, 1993
 Passion, Colonel Ricci, Broadway, 1994
 1776, Edward Rutledge, Broadway, 1997
 Les Misérables, Javert, Broadway, 1999
 Thief River, Ray 2/Reese, Off-Broadway, 2001
 Reefer Madness, Lecturer, Off-Broadway, 2001

 Into the Woods, The Wolf/Cinderella's Prince, Broadway, 2002
 Wonderful Town, Robert Baker, Broadway, 2003
 Opening Doors (Sondheim Concert, New York City), Performer, 2004
 Flight, Charles Lindbergh, Off-Broadway, 2005
 Rags (World AIDS Day Concert, New York City), Nathan, 2006
 A Tale of Two Cities, Dr. Alexandre Manette, Broadway, 2008
 Show Boat, (Show Boat in Concert), Steve, Carnegie Hall, June 2008
 Sweeney Todd: The Demon Barber of Fleet Street, Sweeney Todd, The Drury Lane Theatre, 2011
 The Mystery of Edwin Drood, Reverend Mr. Crisparkle, Broadway, 2012
 Secondhand Lions: A New Musical, Garth, 2013
 First Wives Club, Aaron, Chicago, 2015

Selected filmography
 Little Children (2006)
 Spider-Man 2 (2004)
 Hollywood Ending (2002)
 Cradle Will Rock (1999)
 Buster & Chauncey's Silent Night (1998) Father Joseph (singing)
 Anastasia (1997) (voice)
 Beauty and the Beast: The Enchanted Christmas (1997) (voice, uncredited)
 Hudson River Blues (1997) as Dudley 
 The First Wives Club (1996)
 Green Card (1990)
 Crimes and Misdemeanors (1989)
 The Manhattan Project (1986)

Awards and nominations
 1990: Tony Award nomination for Best Actor in a Musical, City of Angels
 1993: Tony Award nomination for Best Featured Actor in a Musical, Anna Karenina
 1998: Tony Award nomination for Best Featured Actor in a Musical, 1776
 1998: Drama Desk Award for Outstanding Featured Actor in a Musical, 1776
 1998: Outer Critics Circle Award nomination for Outstanding Featured Actor in a Musical, 1776
 2002: Tony Award nomination for Best Featured Actor in a Musical, Into the Woods
 2002: Drama Desk Award nomination for Outstanding Featured Actor in a Musical, Into the Woods
 2004: Outer Critics Circle Award nomination for Outstanding Actor in a Musical, Wonderful Town

Quotes
"I started crying like a teenage girl." - Gregg Edelman on learning of his Into the Woods Tony nomination, to Broadway.com, May 2002.

References

External links

Gregg Edelman at Broadway.com
An interview, circa 2004
A Tale of Two Cities
Gregg Edelman on Facebook

1958 births
American male film actors
American male musical theatre actors
American male stage actors
American male television actors
American male voice actors
Drama Desk Award winners
Living people
Male actors from Chicago
People from Leonia, New Jersey
Northwestern University School of Communication alumni
20th-century American male actors
21st-century American male actors